The Peggy Lee Songbook: There'll Be Another Spring is a 1989 studio album by Peggy Lee.

Track listing
 "Circle in the Sky" (Peggy Lee, Emil Palame) 2:58
 "I Just Want to Dance All Night" (Lee, John Chiodini) 4:01
 "He's a Tramp" (Lee, Sonny Burke) 2:34
 "There'll Be Another Spring" (Lee, Hubie Wheeler) 4:19
 "Johnny Guitar" (Lee, Victor Young) 5:22
 "Fever" (Eddie Cooley, John Davenport) 3:24
 "I'll Give It All to You" (Lee, Chiodini) 2:34
 "Sans Souci" (Burke, Lee) 3:10
 "Where Can I Go Without You?" (Lee) 4:53
 "Boomerang (I'll Come Back to You)" (Lee, Chiodini) 3:30
 "Things Are Swingin'" (Lee, Jack Marshall) 2:31
 "Over the Wheel" (Lee, Chiodini) 3:30
 "The Shining Sea" (Lee, Johnny Mandel) 2:34

References

1989 albums
Peggy Lee albums